The 1st Military Police Brigade (1 MP Bde) is a policing formation of the British Army, which is the only one-star command of the Royal Military Police.  The brigade was formed in 2014, but due to be reduced to a Colonel's command in 2022 and re-structure by 2023.

History

Army 2020 
Prior to December 2014, the military police regiments of the Royal Military Police (RMP) were part of their respective commands: 1st Regiment under 1st (UK) Armoured Division; 2nd Regiment under Headquarters Northern Ireland (reformed in 2006, unknown history after 2007); 3rd Regiment under 3rd (UK) Mechanised Division; 4th Regiment under 101st Logistic Brigade; and 5th Regiment under 102nd Logistic Brigade.  However, under the Army 2020 programme announced in 2013, following the Strategic Defence and Security Review of 2010, the Royal Military Police was rationalised and completely reorganised, among other things.  Under this reform, the 2nd and 5th Regiments were to disband and their companies either disbanded or transferred to the three remaining regiments (1st, 3rd, and 4th).  These three regiments would become 'hybrid' and 'integrated' police units, each with two regular provost companies and one territorial (reserve from 2015) company.  In addition, the new Special Operations Unit, RMP which stood up in 2014.

On formation on 1 December 2014, the brigade was organised as follows:

 Brigade Headquarters, at Marlborough Lines, Andover
 1st Regiment, Royal Military Police, at Gaza Barracks, Catterick Garrison
 110 Provost Company, at Leuchars Station
 150 Provost Company
 243 Provost Company (Army Reserve), in Livingston
 252 Platoon, in Stockton-on-Tees
 3rd Regiment, Royal Military Police, at Wing Barracks, Bulford Camp
 158 Provost Company, at Kiwi Barracks, Bulford Camp
 174 Provost Company, at Parsons Barracks, Donnington
 116 Provost Company (Army Reserve), in Cannock
 Detachment, in Manchester
 4th Regiment, Royal Military Police, at Provost Barracks, Aldershot Garrison
 160 Provost Company
 156 Provost Company, at Goojerat Barracks, Colchester Garrison – supporting 16th Air Assault Bde
 253 (London) Provost Company (Army Reserve), in Tulse Hill
 Special Investigation Branch Regiment, Royal Military Police, at Ward Barracks, Bulford Camp
 No. 1 Investigation Company, at Imphal Barracks, York
 No. 2 Investigation Company, at Parsons Barracks, Donnington
 No. 3 Investigation Company
 37 Investigations Section, at Parsons Barracks, Donnington
 No. 4 Investigation (Special Crimes Team) Company
 83 Investigations Section (Army Reserve), at Bulford Camp
 84 Investigations Section (Army Reserve), at Bulford Camp
 85 Investigations Section (Army Reserve), at Bulford Camp
 Special Operations Regiment, Royal Military Police, at Longmoor Army Camp – later moved to Southwick Park
 Service Police Crime Bureau
 Royal Military Police Close Protection Unit
 Military Provost Staff Corps, at Colchester Garrison
 No. 1 Company, Military Provost Staff (Army Reserve)
 Military Corrective Training Centre, Colchester Garrison

From 2014 until the 2019 Field Army reorganisation, the brigade formed part of Force Troops Command, with the 1st Regiment supporting the 1st UK Division and northern UK operations; 3rd Regiment supporting 3rd UK Division and overseas operations; and 4th Regiment supporting Force Troops command and southern UK operations.

Rather unusually the brigade, unlike the other formations of Force Troops Command, only remained under the command for administrative purposes.  Because of the Royal Military Police's special role, the brigade retained investigative independence from the chain of command, thus being part of Army Headquarters operationally.

On 1 December 2014, the brigade headquarters was established with the Provost Marshal (Army) taking control at Marlborough Lines in Andover, Hampshire known as the 1st Military Police Brigade.

Army 2020 Refine 
In 2017, a supplement to the Army 2020 programme was announced entitled the Army 2020 Refine which reversed many of the unit-level changes of the former.  Under the 'Refine', the 4th Regiment RMP was disbanded in late 2019 and its companies dispersed to the other two remaining regiments

The brigade's structure by 2021 was now as follows:

 1st Regiment, Royal Military Police, at Gaza Barracks, Catterick Garrison
 110 Provost Company, at Leuchars Station
 150 Provost Company
 174 Provost Company, at Parsons Barracks, Donnington
 116 Provost Company (Army Reserve), in Cannock
 Platoon, in Gorton, Manchester
 243 Provost Company (Army Reserve), in Livingston
 252 Platoon, in Stockton-on-Tees
 3rd Regiment, Royal Military Police, at Wing Barracks, Bulford Camp
 158 Provost Company, at Kiwi Barracks, Bulford Camp
 156 Provost Company, at Goojerat Barracks, Colchester Garrison – supporting 16th Air Assault Bde
 160 Provost Company, at Provost Barracks, Aldershot Garrison
 253 (London) Provost Company (Army Reserve), in Tulse Hill
 Special Investigation Branch Regiment, Royal Military Police, at Ward Barracks, Bulford Camp
 No. 1 Investigation Company, at Imphal Barracks, York
 No. 2 Investigation Company, at Parsons Barracks, Donnington
 No. 3 Investigation Company
 37 Investigations Section, at Parsons Barracks, Donnington
 No. 4 Investigation (Special Crimes Team) Company
 83 Investigations Section (Army Reserve), at Bulford Camp
 84 Investigations Section (Army Reserve), at Bulford Camp
 85 Investigations Section (Army Reserve), at Bulford Camp
 Special Operations Regiment, Royal Military Police, at Longmoor Army Camp – later moved to Southwick Park
 Service Police Crime Bureau
 Royal Military Police Close Protection Unit
 Military Provost Staff Corps, at Colchester Garrison
 No. 1 Company, Military Provost Staff (Army Reserve)
 Military Corrective Training Centre, Colchester Garrison

In 2019, under the 2019 Field Army reorganisation, the entirety of the army's forces were reorganised.  With this reorganisation, the 1st and 3rd Regiments RMP were moved to 101st Logistic Brigade, which was later reverted, and the brigade moved to Regional Command, which was also later reverted.  By 2021, the brigade was re-organised into its pre-2019 structure, and the brigade moved under the administrative command of the 1st (United Kingdom) Division.

Future 
In November 2021, the Future Soldier changes were announced which would radically transform the British Army.  Alongside many brigade reductions, the 1st Military Police Brigade will be reduced to a Colonel's command as the 1st Royal Military Police Group.  Rather unusually, according to the British Amy's 'Future Soldier Guide', the Provost Marshal (Army) will continue to command the brigade, though this post is a 1-star brigadier, not a Colonel.  The brigade will see some small internal changes with its regiments restructuring by March 2025.  The brigade is due to remain under Army Headquarters for the foreseeable future.

Commanders 
Commanders of the brigade have all been Provost Marshals and held the title of Provost Marshal (Army) & Commander, 1st Military Police Brigade.

Footnotes

References 

 

Brigades of the British Army
Military units and formations established in 2014
2014 establishments in the United Kingdom
Royal Military Police
Military police units and formations